Mahesh Bhupathi and Max Mirnyi were the defending champions, but lost in semifinals to Mark Knowles and Daniel Nestor.

Mark Knowles and Daniel Nestor won the title, defeating Bob and Mike Bryan 6–3, 6–4 in the final. It was the 35th doubles title for Knowles and the 37th doubles title for Nestor, in their respective careers. It was also the 5th and final title of the year for the pair.

Seeds

Draw

Draw

External links
 Main Draw (ATP)

Doubles